jsMath was a JavaScript library for displaying mathematics in browsers in a cross-platform way.  jsMath is free software released under the Apache License.

jsMath was succeeded by MathJax.

See also 

 MathJax
 TeX and LaTeX, from which jsMath inherits its syntax and layout algorithms
 MathML, a W3C standard enabling direct math rendering in the browser, using an XML syntax
 ASCIIMathML, a client-side library for writing MathML in a subset of LaTeX math syntax
 Google Chart API

References

External links
 
 

Free mathematics software
Free TeX software
JavaScript libraries